Lefkovrysi is a municipal department of the city of Kozani in northern Greece. Located south-west of the city centre, it has a population of 1,208 (2011).

References

Kozani
Populated places in Kozani (regional unit)